The XIX Form is a Swiss single-place paraglider that was designed by Michi Kobler and produced by XIX GmbH of Kronbühl in the mid-2000s. It is now out of production.

Design and development
The Form was designed as an intermediate glider. The design progressed through several generations of models, each improving on the last. The models are each named for their relative size.

Variants
Form 2 S
Small-sized model for lighter pilots. The glider model is Deutscher Hängegleiterverband e.V. (DHV) 2 certified.
Form 2 M
Mid-sized model for medium-weight pilots. The glider model is DHV 2 certified.
Form 2 L
Large-sized model for heavier pilots. The glider model is DHV 2 certified.

Specifications (Form 2 M)

References

Form
Paragliders